The Mongolia men's national junior ice hockey team is the men's national under-20 ice hockey team of Mongolia. The team is controlled by the Mongolian Ice Hockey Federation, a member of the International Ice Hockey Federation. The team made its international debut in December 2018 at the 2019 IIHF U20 Challenge Cup of Asia Division I tournament which it went on to finish second.

History
The Mongolia men's national junior ice hockey team debuted at the 2019 IIHF U20 Challenge Cup of Asia Division I tournament in Kuala Lumpur, Malaysia. Their opening game of the tournament was against Thailand which they lost 1–14, and is also currently their largest loss in international competition. Mongolia went on to win their other two games against Indonesia and Kuwait, finishing the tournament in second. Their 9–2 win against Kuwait is currently their biggest win in international competition. Forward Davaasuren Boldbaatar was selected as the best Mongolian player of the tournament.

International competitions
2019 IIHF U20 Challenge Cup of Asia Division I. Finish: 2nd

Players and personnel

Roster
From the team's most recent tournament

Fixtures and Results

2019
All times are local. (MST – UTC+8)

Team staff
From the team's most recent tournament
Head coach: Mergen Arslan
Assistant coach: Batbold Munkhbayar
Team leader: Javkhlan Bold
Equipment manager: Amarsanaa Dovdon
Doctor: Enkhtaivan Khoonogdoi
Video coach: Temuujin Mergen

References

External links
Mongolia member profile at IIHF.com

Ice hockey in Mongolia
Junior national ice hockey teams
National ice hockey teams in Asia
Ice hockey